Andrey Timofeyevich Shilo (born 11 July 1976) is a Belarusian former footballer.

Career
In 1993/94, Shilo was the youngest member of the Dinamo-93 Minsk first team and helped Belarus qualify for that year's UEFA European Under-18 Championship. 

For 2000, he signed for FK Žalgiris in Lithuania which was perceived as a step back in his career. By age 26, he was playing in the Danish second division with Farum.

Honours
Dinamo-93 Minsk
Belarusian Cup winner: 1994–95

Dinamo Minsk
Belarusian Premier League champion: 1997

Žalgiris Vilnius
Lithuanian Football Cup winner: 2003

References

External links
 Andrei Shilo at FootballFacts.ru 
 

1976 births
Living people
Belarusian footballers
Association football defenders
Association football midfielders
Belarusian expatriate footballers
Expatriate footballers in Lithuania
Expatriate men's footballers in Denmark
Expatriate footballers in Poland
FC Dinamo-93 Minsk players
FC Dinamo Minsk players
FK Žalgiris players
FC Nordsjælland players
FC Veras Nesvizh players
FC Smorgon players
FC Baranovichi players
FC Gorodeya players
Podbeskidzie Bielsko-Biała players